Flak-Bait is a Martin B-26 Marauder aircraft that holds the record within the United States Army Air Forces for the number of bombing missions survived during World War II. Manufactured in Baltimore, Maryland as a B-26B-25-MA, by Martin, it was completed in April 1943 and christened Flak-Bait by its first assigned pilot, James J. Farrell, who adapted the nickname of a family dog, "Flea Bait". Flak-Bait was assigned to the 449th Bombardment Squadron, 322d Bombardment Group stationed in eastern England.

During the course of its 202 (207 if one includes its five decoy missions) bombing missions over Germany as well as the Netherlands, Belgium, and France, Flak-Bait lived up to its name by being shot with over 1,000 holes, returned twice on one engine (once with the disabled engine on fire), lost its electrical system once and its hydraulic system twice. Despite the level of damage it received, none of Flak-Bait's crew were killed during the war and only one was injured. Over two years of operations Flak Bait accumulated 725 hours of combat time and participating in bombing missions in support of the Normandy Landings, the Battle of the Bulge, and Operation Crossbow against V-1 flying bomb sites.

On March 18, 1946, Major John Egan and Captain Norman Schloesser flew Flak-Bait one last time, to an air depot at Oberpfaffenhofen in Bavaria. There the famed bomber was disassembled, crated, and shipped, in December 1946, to a Douglas factory in Park Ridge, Illinois.

The aircraft is currently undergoing preservation and conservation at the Smithsonian Institution's National Air and Space Museum.

A series of red-colored bombs are painted on the side of the aircraft, each representing an individual mission (202 bombs in total). White tails painted on the bombs represented every fifth mission. There is one black-colored bomb which represents a night mission. In addition to the bombs, there are also six red ducks painted on the aircraft representing decoy missions. There is also a detailed Nazi Swastika painted above a bomb to represent Flak-Bait's only confirmed kill against a German aircraft.

See also
List of units using the B-26 Marauder during World War II

References

External links
 Smithsonian Institution article

Individual aircraft of World War II
Individual aircraft in the collection of the Smithsonian Institution